SOS Hermann Gmeiner School, Faridabad was founded in 1986 by Shri J.N Kaul, the then President, SOS Children's Villages (an organisation based in Austria). The school is one of the oldest in Faridabad. The school campus is situated in sector 29 near district police lines and was designed by a German architect.

Hermann Gmeiner School is also known for its children's village, which is a home to orphans. These children are kept in a home-like environment and are provided all kinds of facilities. The school is based on the CBSE pattern and the medium of instruction is English. SOS Hermann Gmeiner School has its branches in almost all states of India and in  about 180 countries and provides free education and housing to orphans. Hermann Gmeiner School was opened to outside and other children in 1986 with an affiliation from CBSE. The school also provides vocational education and industrial training.

in 2016 SOS won a prestigious Zayed Future Energy Prize

References

External links
SOS Children's Villages - International (umbrella organisation)
SOS Children's Wikipedia Collection

Schools in Faridabad
1984 establishments in Haryana
Educational institutions established in 1984
SOS Children's Villages